Wallflower (Laurie Collins) is a fictional character appearing in American comic books published by Marvel Comics. She is a member of the student body of the Xavier Institute and a member of the New Mutants training squad. After the events of M-Day transpired, she was one of a handful of mutants to keep her powers. She first appeared in New Mutants, vol. 2 #2 and died in New X-Men, vol. 2 #25.

Fictional character biography
Laurie is a second-generation mutant. She receives her power from her father, Sean Garrison, who used his hability to manipulate people and get money, fame, and women. Laurie's mother Gail was one of these women. After becoming pregnant with his child, Gail became immune to his power and broke up with him, deciding to raise Laurie alone. Laurie grows up a loner. While on vacation, her powers manifest, causing every boy on the beach to become attracted to her. After she becomes popular, her mother realizes what is going on, and tells Laurie that using her power on people is wrong. As she has no control over it and unwillingly causes people to mirror her own emotions, Laurie gets scared and becomes even more withdrawn than before.

After the Xavier Institute becomes public, Laura is sent there by her mother, and moves to Salem Center to stay near her, so that she could have one person whose reactions she could trust.  Although she insists that Laurie live at the school, so that she could make friends, Laurie remains a loner and goes through several roommates in quick succession.

Eventually Sofia Mantega is paired with Laurie and, with her power to blow pheromones away, Laurie no longer has to worry about accidentally manipulating her roommate. Under pressure from Sofia, she also begins developing acquaintances with David Alleyne and Kevin Ford. On a visit to meet Sofia's former butler, they are attacked by the Reavers, and Laurie is stabbed through the heart. She is saved by Josh Foley, who uses his power to heal her.

Laurie develops an immediate crush on Josh, but before she can pursue it, he falls head-over-heels for Rahne Sinclair. Laurie nonetheless remains smitten with Josh, and the sight of him in mortal danger gives her the emotional fortitude to take conscious control of her powers.

After the mansion is destroyed and rebuilt, she is placed on the official New Mutants squad with Josh, Sofia, David, Surge and Kevin and given the codename Wallflower. When Rahne breaks up with Josh, saying that a relationship with him is inappropriate since she is on the faculty, he begins dating Laurie in order to make Rahne jealous.

Eventually Rahne, feeling it would be healthier for Josh to be with Laurie after she sees the two returning from a date, breaks off her relationship with Josh for good. Kevin spies on their conversation and uses the information to break Josh and Laurie up. Laurie is left embittered by the experience, going so far as to use her pheromones to manipulate Prodigy into kissing her at the dance in a successful attempt to make Josh jealous. Sofia realizes what is happening, and the event adds to the fast disintegration of the squad.

Thereafter, Sofia pushes all the New Mutants into a camp out for one night on the Xavier Institute grounds. While the initial attempts by Sofia at forcing a resolution come to disaster, a fist-fight between Josh and David leads Laurie to confess to Josh what had happened at the dance. Later she - along with the other New Mutants - overhear him pouring his heart out to Icarus, leading her to forgive him enough to be friends.

After the events of House of M, where almost the entire mutant population lost their powers, Laurie was one of the few who retained the mutant gene. Panic spread throughout school in the aftermath of the Decimation and, assuming he'd lost his powers too, Kevin reaches out to Laurie, withering away her arm. Shortly after this trauma, Laurie is shot and killed by a sniper working for the Reverend William Stryker. It is later revealed that Stryker had her killed because a vision from the future foretold she would be the one to single-handedly defeat his army.

A long time later, a maniacal scientist uses Laurie's exhumed genetic material (as well as the genetic material of the X-Men's numerous allies and foes) to create Bio-Sentinel weapons housed within cloned bodies.

Powers and abilities
Wallflower can control emotions through the use of emitted pheromones. Initially she could not control when she released them, and could only match the emotion she felt. Before her death, in her time at Xavier's, she learned to control her powers and could keep her pheromones in check, emit them on command, and could induce a variety of emotional and physical responses, including fear, anger, lust, calmness, happiness and sleep. It was debated by staff writers and X-Men within the comic that if she gained full control of her powers she could apply them to crowd control or putting entire armies to sleep.

Other versions

House of M
When the Scarlet Witch changed reality so that mutants were the dominant species, Laurie was a student at the New Mutant Leadership Institute. As Sofia belonged to the Hellions S.H.I.E.L.D training squad, the girls did not have a close friendship, Sofia even stating that she hated Laurie for being a "daddy's girl."

Laurie was closer to her father and estranged with her human mother in this reality, as well as being close friends with Mercury, her roommate. Both she and her father were deep cover agents of S.H.I.E.L.D. and when Quentin Quire read her mind and discovered the truth she used her pheromone powers to make him suicidal and had him kill himself with his own powers.

The New Mutants and Hellions team up to find Surge's father, a wanted terrorist. When the human terrorists reveal the despicable nature of "Project Genesis" to the shocked New Mutants and Hellions, Laurie reveals her true nature and causes the groups to fight one another to the death, claiming that she does not care about the illegal human experimentation, only about finding and bringing in the human terrorists. Mercury, the only one immune to her powers, pleads with Laurie, as a friend, to stop. Laurie refuses, revealing that she always hated Cessily because she could not manipulate her with her pheromones. Given no other choice, Mercury stabs her through the chest, killing her and ending the fight.

In popular culture
 Wallflower is referenced in the MC chris song "Nrrrd Grrrl": "She's more like a wallflower, Like the one that Stryker sniped, I'm like Elixir when I'm with her, 'Cause I think I like her type."

References

External links
 UncannyXmen.net Character Profile on Wallflower

Comics characters introduced in 2003
Fictional characters from Connecticut
Marvel Comics female superheroes
Marvel Comics mutants
Marvel Comics superheroes
New Mutants
Characters created by Nunzio DeFilippis
Characters created by Christina Weir